The following highways are numbered 685:

United States